Oktay is a Turkish masculine given name. It is also used as a surname. Notable people with the name are as follows:

First name
Oktay Afandiyev (1926–2013), Azerbaijani historian
Oktay Delibalta (born 1985), Turkish football player
Oktay Derelioğlu (born 1975), Turkish football player
Oktay Ekşi (born 1932), Turkish journalist, author and politician
Oktay Güngör (born 1998), Turkish wrestler
Oktay Hamdiev (born 2000), Bulgarian football player
Oktay Kayalp (born 1957), Cypriot politician
Oktay Kaynarca (born 1965), Turkish actor
Oktay Kuday (born 1979), German-Turkish professional football player
Oktay Mahmuti (born 1968), Turkish basketball coach
Oktay Özdemir (born 1986), Turkish-German actor
Oktay Rıfat Horozcu (1914–1988), Turkish writer and playwright
Oktay Sinanoğlu (1935–2015), Turkish scientist 
Oktay Takalak (born 1990), French boxer 
Oktay Urkal (born 1970), Turkish-German professional welterweight
Oktay Vural (born 1956), Turkish lawyer and politician
Oktay Yıldırım (born 1971), Turkish military personnel
Oktay Yusein (born 2000), Bulgarian football player

Middle name
Agah Oktay Güner (born 1937), Turkish journalist and politician
André Oktay Dahl (born 1975), Norwegian politician 
Esat Oktay Yıldıran (1949–1988), Turkish military officer
İhsan Oktay Anar (born 1960), Turkish writer and academic

Surname
Berk Oktay (born 1982), Turkish model and actor
Fuat Oktay (born 1964), Turkish politician, civil servant and academic 
Metin Oktay (1936–1991), Turkish football player
Muhayer Oktay (born 1999), German-born Turkish football player
Süleyman Oktay (born 1959), Turkish football player and manager

Turkish masculine given names
Surnames of Turkish origin
Surnames from given names